Petre Babone (born 14 March 1935) is a Romanian former football striker and manager.

International career
In 1958 Petre Babone played in a friendly game for Romania's B team which ended with a 1–0 loss against East Germany. In 1959 he played one friendly game for Romania's Olympic team which ended with a 2–0 loss against Soviet Union.

Honours
Petrolul Ploiești
Divizia A: 1958–59

References

External links
Petre Babone at Labtof.ro

1935 births
Living people
Romanian footballers
Association football forwards
Liga I players
Liga II players
CSO Plopeni players
Victoria București players
FC Dinamo București players
FC Petrolul Ploiești players
Romanian football managers
Olympic footballers of Romania